Armand Hatchuel (born 1952) is a French researcher and professor of management science and design theory at the Centre for Management Science, Ecole des Mines de Paris. A pioneer in the study of the cognitive and organizational dynamics at play in innovative enterprises, he is behind the development of several theories aimed at re-establishing management science as a fundamental science of collective action.

Academic career 
Armand Hatchuel holds an engineering degree (graduated in 1973) and a PhD in management science from Mines ParisTech. His academic career has taken place primarily at MinesParisTech and the Paris Sciences et Lettres University, first as an assistant lecturer between 1974 and 1985, then as a 2nd class professor between 1984 and 1994. In 1995 he was promoted 1st class professor and then in 2007 an exceptional class professor (2007). From 1998 to 2010, he was also the deputy director of the Centre for Management Science.

In 1995 he created the design engineering programme at Mines ParisTech, that he directed up until 2009. In 2009, along with Benoit Weil, he founded and coordinated the Chair of Design Theory and Methods for Innovation. In 2014, he contributed to creating the Chair of Enterprise Theory, Forms of Governance, and Collective Creation, directed by Blanche Segrestin and Kevin Levillain.

From 1998 to 2006, Armand Hatchuel was a permanent guest professor at Chalmers University in Gothenburg and at the Stockholm School of Economics, where he participated in the FENIX Programme (business and knowledge creation).

CK Theory
Hatchuel, along with Benoit Weil invented C-K theory, a design theory that models creative reasoning and which has been behind multiple scientific and industrial breakthroughs. Hatchuel also developed a theory of prescribing relationships to explain collective learning processes and the crises that they encounter in markets and organizations. He unified his work on rationality and the formation of collectives in his axiomatic theory of collective action. This theory clarified the concept of a "management rule" as an emancipating combination of rationality and responsibility, the history and ancient origins of which the author explored in depth. The results led to a new theory of the enterprise (developed with Blanche Segrestin), which contributed to the enactment of a French law on the enterprise (the Pacte Law of 2019) and, in particular, the establishment of the French société à mission (profit-with-purpose corporation) status.

A chapter of the Palgrave Handbook of Organizational Change Thinkers, as well as a chapter of "Les Grands Auteurs en Management de l'innovation et de la créativité" are dedicated to his work.

Bibliography
 1992 : L’expert et le système,(with Benoit Weil) Economica (English translation 1995, Experts in Organizations, de Gruyter)
 2001 : Les nouvelles fondations des sciences de Gestion (with Albert David and Romain Laufer), Vuibert Fnege (2001, 2e édition. 2008) et 3e edition en 2013, Presses des mines.
 2002 : Les nouvelles raisons du savoir, (with Thierry Gaudin), Colloque de Cerisy, La Tour d'Aigues, Ed. de l'Aube, Coll. "essais".
 2003 : Le libéralisme, l’innovation et la question des limites (with R. Laufer), L’harmattan.
 2006 : Gouvernement, organisation et Gestion : l’héritage de Michel Foucault, (with Ken Starkey, Eric Pezet and Olivier Lenay) Presses de l’université Laval.
 2006 : Les processus d’innovation (with Pascal Le Masson and Benoit weil), Hermés Lavoisier.
 2007 : Les nouveaux régimes de la conception. Langages, théories, métiers. (with Benoit Weil), Colloque de Cerisy, (Vuibert 2007, 2nd édition, 2014, Editions Hermann)
 2010 : Strategic management of innovation and Design, (with Pascal Le Masson et Benoit Weil) Cambridge University Press.
 2012 : Refonder l’entreprise, (with Blanche Segrestin), Seuil, La République des idées.
 2013 : The new foundations of management science (with Albert David and Romain Laufer), Presses des Mines.
 2013 : L’activité Marchande sans le marché? (avec Franck Aggeri and Olivier Favereau ), Colloque de Cerisy, Presses des Mines.
 2014 : Théorie, méthodes et organisation de la Conception, (with Pascal Le Masson and Benoit Weil) Presses des Mines.
 2017 : Design Theory, (with Pascal Le Masson and Benoit Weil), Springer.

Awards and honours 
 Economist of the Year Prize - 1996 (category: Organization and Management)
 Medal of l’École des Arts et Métiers
 Member of the French Academy of Technologies
 Fellow of the international Design society 
 Fellow de la Creativity and innovation Management Community.
 Commander of the Ordre des Palmes académiques 
 Chevalier of the Legion of Honour
 Member of the Economic, Social, and Environmental Council of Morocco (category: expert).

References

External links 
 Interdisciplinary Institute of Innovation 
 Scientific Management Center
 

1952 births
Business theorists
French business theorists
Living people
Management scientists
Mines Paris - PSL alumni
Academic staff of Mines Paris - PSL